The Greater Accra Region has the smallest area of Ghana's 16 administrative regions, occupying a total land surface of 3,245 square kilometres. This is 1.4 per cent of the total land area of Ghana. It is the most populated region, with a population of 5,455,692 in 2021, accounting for 17.7 per cent of Ghana's total population.

The Greater Accra region is the most urbanized region in the country with 87.4% of its total population living in urban centres. The capital city of Greater Accra Region is Accra which is at the same time the capital city of Ghana.

History
In 1960, Greater Accra, then referred to as Accra Capital District, was geographically part of the Eastern Region. It was, however, administered separately by the Minister responsible for local government. With effect from 23 July 1982, Greater Accra was created by the Greater Accra Region Law (PNDCL 26) as a legally separate region.

Geography

Location and size
The Greater Accra Region is bordered on the north by the Eastern Region, on the east by the Volta Region, on the south by the Gulf of Guinea, and on the west by the Central Region. It is smallest region of Ghana in total area, and is made up of 16 administrative areas.

Tourism

Parks 
Shai Reserve
 Lakeside Marina Park
Kwame Nkrumah Memorial Park
 Efua Sutherland Children's Park

Recreation areas 
 National Museum
 La Pleasure Beach
 Kokrobite Beach
 Coco Beach Resort
 Cocoloco Beach
 Korle Beach Resort
 Next Door Beach Resort
 Manet Paradise
 Ada Paradise Beach
 Ningo-Prampram Beach
 Rufus Green Parks
 Labadi Beach
Laboma Beach
Titanic Beach
Bojo Beach
Sandbox beach Club
Afrikiko
Bloombar

National monuments 
 National Theater
 Independence Square
 Accra International Conference Center
 Center for National Culture

National historic sites 
 Kwame Nkrumah Mausoleum
 Osu Castle
 National Museum of Ghana

Festivals
The Ga people celebrate the Homowo festival, which literally means "hooting at hunger." This festival originated several centuries ago. It is celebrated in remembrance of a great famine that hit the Ga people in the sixteenth century. It is mainly a food festival which celebrates the passing of that terrible period in Ga history. It takes place in August every year and is celebrated by all the Ga clans.

The Adangbe people from Ada celebrate the Asafotu festival, which is also called 'Asafotufiam', an annual warrior's festival celebrated by Ada people from the last Thursday of July to the first weekend of August commemorates the victories of the warriors in battle and is a memorial for those who fell on the battlefield. To re-enact these historic events, the warriors dress in traditional battle dress and stage a mock battle. This is also a time for male rites of passage, when young men are introduced to warfare. The festival also coincides with the harvest cycle, when these special customs and ceremonies are performed. These include purification ceremonies. The celebration reaches its climax with a durbar of chiefs, a colourful procession of the Chiefs in palanquins with their retinue. They are accompanied by traditional military groups called 'Asafo Companies' amidst drumming, singing and dancing through the streets and on the durbar grounds. At the durbar, greetings are exchanged between the chiefs, libations are poured and declarations of allegiance are made.

Other tourist attractions
 Fishing port at Jamestown
 Du Bois Memorial Center for Pan-African Culture
 George Padmore Research Library on African Affairs
 Agblobloshie Market
 Makola Market
 Trade Fair Center

Governance 
The political administration of the region is through the local government system. Under this administration system, the region is divided into 29 MMDA's (made up of 2 Metropolitan, 23 Municipal and 4 Ordinary Assemblies). Each District, Municipal or Metropolitan Area and it's corresponding constituency, is administered by a Chief Executive and a Member of Parliamnet, representing the central government but deriving authority from an Assembly headed by a presiding member elected from among the members themselves. The MMDA's were increased from 3 to 5 in 1988; then from 5 to 6 in 2004; then from 6 to 10 in 2008; then from 10 to 16 in 2012; and recently from 16 to 29 in 2018. The number of constituencies increased/spread from 22 to 27 in 2004 making and 34 prior to the 2012 Ghanaian general election.The current list is as follows:

Demographics

Population
The center of population of the Greater Accra region is located in the Greater Accra Metropolitan Area which comprises the Accra Metropolitan, Tema Metropolitan, Adenta Municipal, La Nkwantanang Madina Municipal District, Ashaiman Municipal, Ledzokuku-Krowor Municipal, Ga East Municipal, Ga West Municipal, and Ga South Municipal districts

According to the 2010 census, the region had a population of 4,010,054, making it the second most populous (total number of people) region of Ghana behind the Ashanti Region. Owing to in-migration and a high population growth rate, however, the region has the highest population density in the country.

Ethnicity
The Ga sub-group of the Ga-Dangme people is the historical population of Accra. They form the largest ethnic sub-group in the Greater Accra Region, with 18.9% of the population. The Ga peoples were organized into six independent towns (Accra (Ga Mashie), Osu, La, Teshie, Nungua, and Tema). Each town had a stool, which served as the central object of Ga ritual and war magic. Now, the town of La has a community bank which offers banking services to them. Accra became the most prominent Ga-Dangme towns and is now the heartbeat and capital of Ghana.[4] The Ga people were originally farmers, but today fishing and trading in imported goods are the principal occupations. Trading is generally in the hands of women, and a husband has no control over his wife's money. Succession to most offices held by women and inheritance of women's property are by matrilineal descent. Inheritance of other property and succession to male-held public offices are by patrilineal descent. Men of the lineage live together in a men's compound, while women, even after marriage, live with their mothers and children in a women's compound. Each Ga town has a number of different cults and many gods, and there are a number of annual town festivals. The Adangme people occupy the coastal area of Ghana from Le Kpone to Ada, on the Volta River and South Atlantic Ocean along the Gulf of Guinea and inland along the Volta River. The Adangme People include the Ada, Le Kpone, Krobo, Ningo, Osuduku, Prampram, and Shai, all speaking Adangbe of the Kwa branch of the Niger-Congo family of languages. [5] The Adangme People have the largest Population among the two related Ga-Adangme People. About 70% of the Greater Accra Regional Land is owned by the Adangmes located in Dangme East and Dangme West Districts of Ghana.

Immigration
1.3% of the inhabitants of the Greater Accra Region are immigrants from outside Ghana.

The largest portion of the population of Accra is Akan, at 39.8% of the population. The next largest group is Ga-Dangme at 30.7% of the population. After this 18% of the population is Ewe. The Ga sub-group of the Ga-Dangme people is the historical population of Accra. They form the largest ethnic sub-group in the Greater Accra Region, with 18.9% of the population. The Fante are the next largest ethnic sub-group, with 10% of the population.

Population growth
In 1960 the population of the Greater Accra Region was 491,817. In 2000 the population was 2,905,726. In 2010 the population was 4,010,054.

Religion
The religious affiliations of the people of the Greater Accra region are below:
 Christian – 77.8%
 Muslim –16.2%
 Other Religions – 4.6%
 Traditional – 1.4%

Transportation
The Greater Accra region is served by the Kotoka International Airport in Accra. The airport offers flight to destinations within Ghana, the African continent and to other continents.

Four National highways – N1, N2, N4 and N6 – and one Regional highway – R40 – pass through the Greater Accra region. N1 enters the region in Ada to the east and runs west, intersecting the N2 at Tema, the Ghana Road Network Tetteh Quarshie Interchange, and the N6 at Achimota. It passes through Kokrobite and exits the region at Weija where it continues on through the Central Region to Elubo in the Western region. The N2 crosses the Eastern Regional border into Asikuma and runs north entering the Upper East Region, ending at Kulungugu. The N4 heads north from the Tetteh Quarshie Interchange, while the N6 originates from Achimota.  These highways cut through the northern part of the region and terminate at Kumasi in the Ashanti Region.

There is also an active railway line connecting Accra and Tema.

Education

Senior high schools

 Christian Methodist Senior High School
 Accra Academy
St. Martins Senior High School
 Accra Girls Senior High School
 Accra High School
 Accra Wesley Girls' High School
 Achimota Senior High School
 Ebenezer Senior High School
 Holy Trinity Cathedral Senior High School
 Kaneshie Senior High School
 Kinbu Senior High School
 Presbyterian Senior High School, Osu
 Wesley Grammar Senior High School
 St. Mary's Senior High School
 St. Margaret-Mary Senior High School
 Sacred Heart Vocational Institute
 Accra Technical Training Centre
 Accra Wesley Girls' Senior High School
 Chemu Senior High School
 Manhean Senior High School
 Tema Senior High School
 Methodist Day Senior High School
 Presbyterian Senior High School, Tema
 Our Lady Of Mercy Senior High School
 Tema Technical Institute
 Labone Senior High School
 Presbyterian Senior High Sch, La
 St. Thomas Aquinas Senior High School
 Armed Forces Senior High Technical
 Amasaman Senior High Technical School
 St. John's Grammar Senior High School
 Ngleshie Amanfro Senior High School
 Odorgonno Senior High School
 West African Senior High School
 Presbyterian Boys' Senior High School, Legon
 Ada Senior High School
 Ada Technical Institute 
 Ada Senior High Technical School
 Osudoku Senior High School
 Ningo Senior High School
 Prampram Senior High School
 Ashaiman Senior High School
 Don Bosco Senior High Technical School
 Nungua Senior High School
 O'reilly Senior High School
 Presbyteian Senior High School, Teishie
 Teishie Technical Training Centre
 The Morning Star International High School, Dodowa 
 Kpone Community Day Senior High School
 Kwabenya Community Day Senior High School
 Frafraha Community Day Senior 
 Ghanata Senior High School

Higher education
Greater Accra has three public four-year institutions, the University of Ghana in Accra, Ghana Institute of Journalism and University of Professional Studies, East Legon, Accra. In addition, there are number of private universities and university colleges spread through the region.
 Accra Institute of Technology, Cantonments, Accra
 Ghana Technology University College, Tesano, Accra
 Islamic University College, East Legon, Accra
 Knutsford University College, East Legon, Accra
 Methodist University College, Dansoman, Accra
 Regent University College of Science and Technology, Mataheko, Accra
 Central University, Mataheko/Miotso, Accra
 Advanced Business University College, Kaneshie, Accra
 African University College of Communications, Adabraka, Accra
 Wisconsin International University College, North Legon, Accra
 Valley View University, Oyibi, Accra
 Regional Maritime University, Nungua
 Pentecost University College, Sowutuom
 Jayee University College, McCarthy Hills
 Maranatha University College, Sowutuom
 University of Applied Management, Ghana Campus, McCarthy Hill 18th Avenue
 Zenith University College, LA-Behind Ghana Trade Fair Centre, Accra
 Radford University College, East-Legon, Accra
 University of Professional Studies, Accra  East-Legon, Ghana
 Webster University, Ghana Campus, East Legon, Accra
 Accra College of Medicine, East Legon, Accra
 Family Health Medical School, Teshie, Accra

Shopping centres and their locations
 Accra Mall - Tetteh Quarshie Roundabout
 Melcom Shopping Centers- Accra Central,Adabraka, North Industrial Area, Spintex, Teshie, La, Dansoman, East Legon, Madina, Fafraha, Achimota, Wejja, Kasoa etc.
 Marina Mall - Airport Area
 West Hills Mall - Weija
 Oxford Street Mall - Osu
 The Junction Mall - Nungua
 The Achimota Mall - Achimota
 A&C Mall - East Legon
 The Palace Malls - Spintex, Atomic Junction
 The China Mall - Spintex

Sports
 Accra Hearts of Oak, Premier League Football
 Great Olympics, Premier League Football
 International Allies F.C., Division One League
 Liberty Professionals, Division One League
 Tema Youth F.C., Division One League
 Legon Cities F.C., Premier League Football
Accra Lions F.C, Premier League Football

Famous native and resident citizens

References

 
Regions of Ghana